Filipe Ribeiro do Nascimento (born 27 May 1995), commonly known as Filipe Ribeiro, is a Brazilian footballer who plays as a midfielder for Volta Redonda Futebol Clube.

Career statistics

Club

References

1995 births
Living people
Brazilian footballers
Brazilian expatriate footballers
Association football midfielders
Liga Portugal 2 players
Grêmio Osasco Audax Esporte Clube players
Audax Rio de Janeiro Esporte Clube players
Paulista Futebol Clube players
Club Sportivo Sergipe players
Sporting CP B players
Leixões S.C. players
Brazilian expatriate sportspeople in Portugal
Expatriate footballers in Portugal
Footballers from São Paulo